Arthur Morris Jones (1889–1980), was a missionary and musicologist who worked in Zambia during the early 20th century. He was stationed at St Mark's School in Mapanza, a community in the Southern Province of present-day Zambia (called Rhodesia at the time). He is best known for his ethnomusicological work, particularly his two-volume Studies in African Music. He made an important contribution to the literature with his work in African rhythmic structure.

In 1934 he introduced the technical term cross-rhythm: Formulae of movement, phrases or motifs are combined in that way, that their starting place, main accents and, or beat reference points "cross", that is, that they do not coincide.

He is also remembered for his controversial theories on scales and the music of the xylophone, which he claimed migrated from Southeast Asia to Africa. One hundred of Jones' acetate field recordings are part of the British Library Sound Archive (number C424).

Bibliography
 Jones, A.M. Africa and Indonesia: The Evidence of the Xylophone and Other Musical and Cultural Factors.  Leiden: Brill, 1964.
 Jones, A.M. "African Hymnody in Christian Worship." Gwelo: Mambo Press, 1976.
 Jones, A.M. African Music. Rhodes-Livingstone Museum Occasional Papers; No. 2. Livingstone, Northern Rhodesia: Rhodes-Livingstone Institute, 1943.
 Jones, A.M. African Rhythm. London: International African Institute, 1954.
 Jones, A.M. Studies in African Music. 2 vols. London: New York, 1978.
 Jones, A.M., and L. Kombe. The Icila Dance, Old Style. A Study in African Music and Dance of the Lala Tribe of Northern Rhodesia. Roodepoort, South Africa: Published by Longmans, Green and Co. for African Music Society, 1952.

References

External links
 British Library Sound Archive catalogue
 Listen to Arthur Morris Jones recordings

1889 births
1980 deaths
Protestant missionaries in Zambia
British ethnomusicologists
People associated with the Rhodes-Livingstone Institute
English Protestant missionaries
20th-century British musicologists